Bernard Bellec (8 May 1934 – 23 February 2023) was a French politician of the Socialist Party (PS).

Biography

A member of the PS, Bellec became Deputy Mayor of Niort in 1971 before becoming Mayor in 1986 after the sudden death of his predecessor, . He was re-elected in 1995 despite a dispute with party leader Ségolène Royal. He was re-elected again in 2001 but resigned on 6 December 2002 following pressure from party activist Étienne Bonnin.

Bernard Bellec died in Niort on 23 February 2023, at the age of 88.

Distinctions
Commander of the Legion of Honour (1998)

References

1934 births
2023 deaths
Mayors of places in Nouvelle-Aquitaine
Socialist Party (France) politicians
People from Hayange
Commandeurs of the Légion d'honneur